Alteraurantiacibacter aquimixticola is a Gram-negative, aerobic and non-motile bacterium from the genus of Alteraurantiacibacter.

References 

Sphingomonadales
Bacteria described in 2019